Cyprus was present at the Eurovision Song Contest 1994. It was represented with the song "Eimai anthropos ki ego", performed by Evridiki. It finished 11th with 51 points.

Before Eurovision 

Originally, Cyprus was relegated from the contest because it finished in the bottom 7 of the 1993 contest; however, after Italy withdrew from the contest, their place was awarded to Cyprus, who ultimately competed.

National final 
The final was held at the International Conference Centre in Nicosia on 18 March 1994. The winning song was chosen by an "expert" jury.

Voting 

On the night of the contest Cyprus performed 4th, following Ireland and preceding Iceland. At the close of voting it had received 51 points, placing Cyprus 11th out of 25 entries. The Cypriot jury awarded its 12 points to Greece.

Voting

References 

1994
Countries in the Eurovision Song Contest 1994
Eurovision